This article is about the particular significance of the year 1976 to Wales and its people.

Incumbents
Secretary of State for Wales – John Morris
Archbishop of Wales – Gwilym Williams, Bishop of Bangor
Archdruid of the National Eisteddfod of Wales – Bryn

Events
17 February - Operation Julie is launched; it eventually results in the break-up of one of the largest LSD manufacturing operations in the world.
March - The Welsh Regional Office of the European Community opens in Cardiff.
June–September - 1976 United Kingdom heat wave: A very hot summer brings a major drought with water shortages.
July - Miners’ leader Dai Francis challenges the Prince of Wales (now Charles III), in the election for Chancellor of the University of Wales.
25 July - Former Submarine Commander Neil Rutherford, DSC & Bar, murders four people at the Red Gables Hotel in Penmaenmawr.
4 October - The InterCity 125 high speed train runs for the first time between Swansea railway station and London Paddington.
7 December - Swansea-born former fashion model Lilian Davies marries Prince Bertil of Sweden at Drottningholm Palace after a 30-year relationship.
date unknown - David Emanuel marries Elizabeth Weiner.

Arts and literature
May 27 - Actor Stanley Baker is given a knighthood in the Prime Minister's Resignation Honours, a few months before his death.
August - Dic Jones loses the National Eisteddfod chair on a technicality.
October - Mistar Urdd is created by Wynne Melville Jones.
unknown date - Griff Rhys Jones becomes Vice-President of the Cambridge University Footlights Dramatic Club.

Awards
National Eisteddfod of Wales (held in Cardigan)
National Eisteddfod of Wales: Chair - Alan Llwyd
National Eisteddfod of Wales: Crown - Alan Llwyd
National Eisteddfod of Wales: Prose Medal - Marged Prichard

New books

English language
Ruth Bidgood - Not Without Homage
Glyn Davies - Overseas Investment In Wales
Kenneth O. Morgan - Keir Hardie
Bernice Rubens - I Sent a Letter to My Love

Welsh language
John Emyr - Enaid Clwyfus
Alun Llywelyn-Williams - Gwanwyn yn y Ddinas
Owain Owain - Y Dydd Olaf

Poetry
J. M. Edwards - Cerddi Ddoe a Heddiw - Egin
Donald Evans
Geraint Jarman - Cerddi Alfred Street
Gwilym R. Jones - Y Syrcas a Cherddi Eraill

New drama
John Gwilym Jones - Gobaith Mawr y Ganrif

Music
Edward H. Dafis - 'Sneb yn Becso Dam
Alun Hoddinott - Murder the Magician (opera)
Dafydd Iwan - Mae'r Darnau yn Disgyn i'w Lle (album)
Geraint Jarman - Gobaith Mawr y Ganrif (album)
Daniel Jones - Dance Fantasy
Man - The Welsh Connection
Bonnie Tyler - "Lost in France" (debut single)

Film

Welsh-language films
Y Dieithryn, produced by Emlyn Williams

Broadcasting
Sir Huw Wheldon is knighted for his services to broadcasting.

Welsh-language television

Welsh language radio
Tros Fy Sbectol

English-language television
How Green Was My Father, with Ryan Davies

Sport
Football – The Wales national football team plays in the quarter-finals of UEFA Euro 1976.
BBC Wales Sports Personality of the Year – Mervyn Davies and the Wales national rugby union team.
Rugby union – Wales win their seventh Grand Slam.
Snooker
30 January – Ray Reardon wins the Masters.
23 April – Ray Reardon wins his fifth World Championship title.

Births
14 January - Scott Young, footballer
6 April - James Fox, singer
8 May - Ian Watkins, pop singer
13 May - Mark Delaney, footballer
16 June - Cian Ciaran, musician
25 June - Iestyn Harris, rugby player
14 July - Geraint Jones, cricketer
9 August - Aled Haydn-Jones, radio producer
1 November - Buffy Williams, politician
7 November - Andrew Davies, cricketer
20 December – Adam Powell, inventor
date unknown - Steffan Cravos, musician and language activist

Deaths
3 January – Mal Evans, Beatles' former roadie and patron of Badfinger, 40 (shot)
23 January – Sir Tudor Thomas, ophthalmic surgeon, 82
26 January – Eric Francis, architect, 88
4 February – Roger Livesey, actor, 69
12 February – John Lewis, Marxist philosopher, 87
14 February - Tommy Scourfield, dual code rugby player, 66 
29 March - Harold Davie, rugby player, 77
26 March - Duster Bennett, blues musician, 29 (car accident)
30 March - Jackie Mittell, footballer, 70
31 March - Billy Moore, rugby player, 66
18 April – Haydn Davies, politician, 70
28 April – Richard Hughes, novelist, 76
6 June – David Jacobs, athlete, 88
20 June – Sir Goronwy Edwards, historian, 84 
28 June – Sir Stanley Baker, actor, 48
18 July – Jenkin Alban Davies, Wales international rugby captain, 90
22 July – Willie Evans, Welsh international footballer, 63
30 August - David Rees-Williams, 1st Baron Ogmore, politician, 72
10 October - David Lewis, 1st Baron Brecon, politician, 71
7 November - Glyn Davies, Wales international rugby union player, 49
22 November - Rupert Davies, actor, 60 (cancer)
24 November - Ambrose Baker, rugby player, ?79
date unknown 
Eveline Annie Jenkins, botanical artist, 82/83
Meirion Williams, songwriter

See also
1976 in Northern Ireland

References

Wales
 Wales